Peeter Ruubel (13 October 1885 Kaarli Parish, Viljandi County - 24 December 1957) was an Estonian politician. He was a member of Estonian Constituent Assembly. He was a member of the assembly since 7 October 1919. He replaced Karl Saar.

References

1885 births
1957 deaths
Members of the Estonian Constituent Assembly